Collection is an album by American pianist Dave Grusin released in 1989, recorded for the GRP label. Collection is a retrospective of Grusin's work from 1976–1989 . The album reached No. 3 on Billboard's Contemporary Jazz chart.

Track listing
All tracks composed by Dave Grusin; except where indicated
"She Could Be Mine" (Don Grusin) – 5:15
"Thankful 'n' Thoughtful" (Sylvester Stewart) – 4:10
"River Song" (Dave Grusin, Don Grusin) – 5:10
"Playera" (Enrique Granados, Carlos Molina) – 8:44
"An Actor's Life" from the movie Tootsie – 5:07
"St. Elsewhere" theme from the TV show St. Elsewhere – 4:13
"Serengeti Walk" (Dave Grusin, Harvey Mason, Louis Johnson) – 6:16
"Early A.M. Attitude" – 4:58
"Bossa Baroque" – 4:17
"Lupita" – 1:08
"On Golden Pond" main theme from the movie On Golden Pond – 3:35
"Mountain Dance" – 6:14

Personnel
 Dave Grusin – Fender Rhodes electric piano, piano, synthesizers, percussion, conductor
 Don Grusin – synthesizers
 David Sanborn – saxophone
 Grover Washington, Jr. – saxophone on "Playera"
 Ernie Watts – saxophone on "An Actor's Life"
 Lee Ritenour – guitar
 Eric Gale – guitar on "Serengeti Walk"
 Carlos Ruiz – guitar
 Marcus Miller – bass
 Abraham Laboriel – bass
 Jimmy Johnson – bass on "Early A.M. Attitude"
 Steve Gadd – drums
 Harvey Mason – drums
 Rubens Bassini – percussion
 Paulinho Da Costa – percussion on "Early A.M. Attitude"
 Carlos Vega – drums on "Early A.M. Attitude"

Charts

References

External links
Dave Grusin-Collection at Discogs
Dave Grusin-Collection at AllMusic

1989 compilation albums
GRP Records compilation albums
Dave Grusin albums